40 Camelopardalis is a single star in the northern circumpolar constellation of Camelopardalis, located around 600 light years distant from the Sun. It is visible to the naked eye as a faint, orange-hued star with an apparent visual magnitude of 5.37. This object is moving further from the Earth with a heliocentric radial velocity of +8.6 km/s.

This is an aging giant star with a stellar classification of K3 III, having exhausted the hydrogen at its core and evolved away from the main sequence. It has expanded to 39 times the Sun's radius and is radiating 424 times the luminosity of the Sun from its enlarged photosphere at an effective temperature of 4,188 K.

There is a magnitude 11.50 optical companion, located at an angular separation of  along a position angle of 355° from 40 Camelopardalis, as of 2010.

References

K-type giants
Double stars
Camelopardalis (constellation)
Durchmusterung objects
Camelopardalis,40
042633
029730
2201